Archana Kochhar (born 1972) is an Indian fashion designer and is often counted in the list of top five fashion designers in India. She is mainly known for her global design sensibilities.

Archana Kochhar has been invited to showcase her collection on National & International runways. Kochhar has showcased her designs at events like Lakme Fashion Week, India Fashion Week and New York Fashion Week.

She has been working closely with the honourable Prime Minister Narendra Modi on the “Make in India” campaign in her various projects such as Banjara and Warli.

She has also worked closely with the tribal women weavers from Jharkhand on the “Ahimsa silk” fabric, which is produced without killing a single silkworm; and has globalised this concept by showcasing this unique silk at the New York Fashion Week.

Archana exhibited Make in India driven Ahimsa silk saree with an objective to generate employment in weaving community for Women Empowerment  at Satya Brahma's initiative at Indian Affairs 6th Annual India Leadership Conclave 2015 in Mumbai.

She has showcased her contemporary collections at the New York Fashion Week for several seasons. One of the most memorable ones was promoting the awareness of acid-burned victims through the “Bring Beauty Back” movement by having acid-survivor Reshma Qureshi take to the ramp, which was covered by over 280 media houses across the globe, including The New York Times, Cosmopolitan, and Vogue.

Being one of the few designers who firmly believes in sharing her fashion platform with various philanthropic projects, she is also the goodwill ambassador for “Smile Foundation” with Cricket Maestro Virat Kohli and Master Chef Vikas Khanna, in support of girl child education.
She was conferred with the Anokhi Excellence in Design 2015 award in Toronto, Canada. The Designer was conferred "Fashion Designer of the Decade" at India Leadership Conclave 2015.

Archana is also a favourite amongst Bollywood glitterati, including Shahrukh Khan, Kareena Kapoor, and Kangana Ranaut to name a few. Archana's designs have been featured by celebrities like Prabhu Deva, Shriya Saran, Amrita Rao, Nargis Fakhri, Jacqueline Fernandez, Bipasha Basu and Vijender Singh among others. 
She has dressed celebrities for the Cannes Festival, and was also invited by Galeries Lafayette, Paris to showcase her couture collections alongside international design houses like Armani, Versace, Prada & Gucci.

To experience her artisanal creations, go visit her flagship store in Juhu, Mumbai.

New York Fashion Week
As a part of Prime Minister Narendra Modi's Make in India campaign, Kochhar's collection introduced the indigenous ahimsa silk (Peace Silk) at New York Fashion Week, 2015. Her designs were featured by amputee model Rebekah Marine.
She has showcased her contemporary collections at the New York Fashion Week for several seasons. One of the most memorable ones was promoting the awareness of acid-burned victims through the “Bring Beauty Back” movement by having acid-survivor Reshma Qureshi take to the ramp, which was covered by over 280 media houses across the globe, including The New York Times, Cosmopolitan, and Vogue.

References

Living people
1972 births
Indian women fashion designers